Semisulcospira niponica is a species of freshwater snail with an operculum, an aquatic gastropod mollusk in the family Semisulcospiridae.

Distribution 
This species occurs in the Lake Biwa, Japan.

Ecology
Semisulcospira niponica lives in habitats with rocky bottom.

References

External links

Semisulcospiridae